Tatjana Tchumatchenko (born 1980) is a physicist in the field of theoretical neuroscience. She is an independent Max Planck Group Leader and, since November 2020, professor for Computational Neuroscience of Behavior at the Faculty of Medicine of the Rheinische Friedrich-Wilhelms-Universität Bonn (Germany). In her research she investigates how neural networks compute and how particular activity patterns emerge from synaptic and neuronal features.

Education and early research 
In 2006, Tchumatchenko obtained her diploma in physics at the Technical University of Darmstadt (Germany). In 2010, she completed the Graduate Program “Theoretical and Computational Neuroscience” at the Göttingen Graduate Center for Neurosciences, Biophysics, and Molecular Biosciences at Göttingen University (Germany), and received the degree of Dr. rer. nat in physics. In 2011, she was a Postdoctoral Fellow with a joint appointment at the Max Planck Institute for Dynamics and Self-Organization and the Bernstein Center for Computational Neuroscience Göttingen. From 2011 to 2013, Tatjana Tchumatchenko was a Postdoctoral Fellow at the Center for Theoretical Neuroscience at Columbia University in the City of New York, USA, funded by the Volkswagen Foundation.

Career 
In 2013, Tchumatchenko became an Independent Research Group Leader at the Max Planck Institute for Brain Research (Germany). Her group „Theory of neural dynamics” focuses on the computational modelling and mathematical analysis of single neurons, neuronal populations, and recurrent networks. The Tchumatchenko group employs mathematical tools and computer simulations to investigate how single neurons and populations respond to their synaptic inputs, and how they interact to give rise to functioning neuronal circuits.

Selected memberships 

 Bernstein Network for Computational Neuroscience
 International Max Planck Research School (IMPRS) for Neural Circuits
German-Ukrainian Academic Society

Selected Awards and Honours 

 2020: Member of the Young Academy of Europe
 2020: ERC Starting Grant of the European Research Council
 2018: Selected by the Focus magazine as one of 25 young innovators who will shape Germany in the next 25 years
 2016 & 2017: Dollwet Foundation Award
 2016: Heinz Maier-Leibnitz-Prize of the German Research Foundation (DFG)
 2011 – 2013: Computational Sciences fellowship by the Volkswagen Foundation
 2004 – 2006: Fellow of the German National Merit Foundation
 2001: Award of the Membership in the German Physical Society

References

External links 

 Publications of Tatjana Tchumatchenko in the German National Library, retrieved 2020-12-29
 The National Library of Medicine (USA) lists some publications of Tatjana Tchumatchenko, retrieved 2020-12-29
 Principal Investigators of the Collaborative Research Centre 1080, retrieved 2020-12-29
 Tatjana Tchumatchenko gives a lecture on the MidsummerBrains Colloquium of the SMARTSTART Joint Training Program in Computational Neuroscience of the Bernstein Network Computational Neuroscience and the Volkswagen Foundation in 2019, retrieved 2020-12-29
 The Tchumatchenko lab is affiliated with the DFG-funded Research Unit FOR2333 on mRNA localization, retrieved 2020-12-29
 You can find the profile of Tatjana Tchumatchenko at The Open Science Research Network, on the platform of  ResearchGate, and on the website of ORCID, retrieved 2020-12-29
 Tatjana Tchumatchenko presents a lecture on the Theory of Network Dynamics at the Cajal Course in Computational Neuroscience 2017, retrieved 2020-12-29
 The platform Studylib and Cicero magazine have published a portrait of Tatjana Tchumatchenko (in German), retrieved 2020-12-29
 The platform "innovations report" explains a part of the research of Tatjana Tchumatchenko, retrieved 2020-12-29

1980 births
Living people
University of Göttingen alumni
21st-century German scientists
German neuroscientists